Japan participated and hosted the 2003 Asian Winter Games held in Aomori Prefecture, from February 1, 2003 to February 8, 2003. This country garnered 24 gold medals securing its top spot in the medal tally.

Participation details

Medal table

References

Nations at the 2003 Asian Winter Games
Asian Winter Games
Japan at the Asian Winter Games